Härtel or Hartel may refer to:

August Hartel (1844–1890), German architect
Dr Kurt Hartel (1910–2000), German patent lawyer
Gottfried Christoph Härtel (1763–1827), music publisher in Leipzig
Jens Härtel (born 1969), German football manager and former player
Karsten Härtel (born 1961), former German footballer
Lis Hartel (1921–2009), equestrian from Denmark
Marcel Hartel (born 1996), German professional footballer
Michael Hartel (born 1998), German speedway, grasstrack and longtrack rider
Sascha Härtel (born 1999), German professional footballer
Stefan Härtel (born 1988), German professional boxer
Susanne Hartel (born 1988), German football player
Wilhelm von Hartel (1839–1907), Austrian philologist in classical studies
Yvonne von Hartel AM, architect and urban planner

See also
Härtel Antiqua, a font produced by Schriftguss AG
Hartel Barrier, a storm surge barrier in Spijkenisse, Netherlands
Breitkopf & Härtel, the world's oldest music publishing house